Société Générale, London Branch v Geys [2012] UKSC 63 is a UK labour law case, concerning wrongful dismissal. The Supreme Court's decision was a significant ruling in regard to the competing automatic and elective theories of contractual repudiation, affirming the elective theory.

Facts
Raphael Geys's contract with Société Générale allowed for payment upon termination, three months' written notice, and incorporated the staff handbook which said in s.8.3 that he could be dismissed immediately, and the contract would terminate, if pay in lieu of notice was made. On 29 November 2007, he had a meeting and was dismissed in breach of contract. He was escorted from the building. On 18 December 2007, he received the pay in lieu in his bank account, and was sent a payslip that included details of "in lieu pay". He was not given a separate notice, or advised that the right to terminate the contract had in fact been exercised. Mr Geys's solicitors wrote on 2 January that Geys was affirming the contract. On 4 January 2008, Société Générale gave notice that the payment was in lieu of notice. Mr Geys brought proceedings.

The High Court held in favour of Mr Geys. The Court of Appeal overturned the High Court. It held Geys's contract was terminated on 18 December when pay in lieu of notice was given, but rejected Société Générale's further argument that the repudiatory dismissal on 29 November automatically terminated the contract. The Court of Appeal's ruling raised a concern that a payment made in lieu of notice but not supported by a notice of dismissal could mean staff are dismissed without realising or without knowledge of the date on which their dismissal was effective.

Judgment
The Supreme Court held (Lord Hope, Lady Hale, Lord Wilson and Lord Carnworth in the majority) that Mr Geys's contract was not automatically terminated with Société Générale's wrongful repudiation. The contract would only end if the other party elected to accept such a repudiation. If it automatically terminated, this would potentially reward the party who wrongfully repudiated the contract on the termination date it chose. In many cases, provisions of a unilaterally repudiated contract would survive and be enforceable, such as covenants against competition or disciplinary procedure clauses. The staff handbook, s.8.3, made no difference to the fact that an employee had to be notified of termination. Société Générale had not given clear notice to Geys about the payment. It was only on 6 January, when Geys received Société Générale's letter of 4 January, that the contractual right to terminate under the pay in lieu of notice method was validly exercised. Only then did Gey's employment with Société Générale come to an end.

Lord Hope said the following.

Lord Wilson focused criticism on the 'automatic theory' of termination.

Lord Sumption dissented. He said there should be a general rule that an innocent party to a repudiated contract could not treat it as subsisting if his performance would require the other party's cooperation. Cooperation, and specific performance could not be compelled. So, in his minority view, Gunton was wrong, and Geys was receiving a windfall given that the majority was preferring the "elective" theory over the "automatic" theory of termination.

See also

UK labour law

References

United Kingdom labour case law
Supreme Court of the United Kingdom cases
2012 in British law
2012 in case law
Société Générale